Cristian Jesús Reynaldo Gómez (born 16 September 1978) is a Bolivian football manager and former player who played as a forward.

References

1978 births
Living people
People from Trinidad, Bolivia
Bolivian footballers
Club Bolívar players
Club Real Potosí players
The Strongest players
Club Blooming players
C.D. Jorge Wilstermann players
Club San José players
Municipal Real Mamoré players
Nacional Potosí players
La Paz F.C. players
Bolivian Primera División players
Association football forwards
Bolivian football managers
Libertad Gran Mamoré F.C. managers